Broad Oak is a small village near the town of Heathfield, East Sussex, England, often referred to as Broad Oak Heathfield, as there is a village with the same name, also in East Sussex, near to Brede. It is in the civil parish of Heathfield and Waldron. In 2020 it had an estimated population of 1093.

A village shop, village hall with children's play area and church are located on the main road, the A265, which runs through the village, eventually leading to the High Street in the town of Heathfield

Despite strong opposition from the community, concerns raised in parliament and with little to no proper justification, East Sussex County Council pushed through closure of the village primary school in 2020, in favour of housing development on the site.

References 

Villages in East Sussex
Wealden District